List of the most important cities, towns and villages in the Río Negro Province in Argentina, with their municipal population.

Allen (26,083)
Campo Grande (4,571)
Colonia Catriel (15,169)
Cervantes (5,173)
Chichinales (4,060)
Chimpay (3,905)
Choele Choel (10,642)
Cinco Saltos (19,819)
Cipolletti (75,078)
Comallo (1,306)
Contralmirante Cordero (2,782)
Coronel Belisle (1,841)
Darwin (1,052)
Dina Huapi (2,243)
El Bolsón, Río Negro (15,537)
General Conesa (5,595)
General Fernández Oro (6,813)
General Roca (78,275)
Ingeniero Jacobacci (5,785)
Ingeniero Luis A. Huergo (6,483)
Lamarque (7,819)
Los Menucos (2,689)
Luis Beltrán (6,401)
Mainqué (2,658)
Maquinchao (2,195)
Pilcaniyeu (1,467)
Pomona (987)
Río Colorado (13,675)

San Antonio Oeste (16,966)
Las Grutas (approx. 2,500)
San Carlos de Bariloche (93,101)
Sierras Coloradas (1,374)
Sierra Grande (6,978)
Valcheta (3,596)
Viedma (47,437)
Balneario El Cóndor (approx. 1,300)
Villa Regina (31,209)